Trichopisthia is a monotypic moth genus in the family Lasiocampidae erected by Per Olof Christopher Aurivillius in 1909. Its single species, Trichopisthia monteiroi, described by Hamilton Herbert Druce in 1887, is found in Zimbabwe, Mozambique and KwaZulu-Natal, South Africa.

References

Lasiocampidae
Monotypic moth genera